One male and one female athlete from Palestine participated in the 2000 Summer Paralympics in Sydney, Australia. It was the first Palestinian Territories participation in the Paralympic Games. Husam Azzam won Palestine's only medal: a bronze in the shot put.

List of medalists

See also
2000 Summer Paralympics
Palestine at the Paralympics
Palestine at the 2000 Summer Olympics

External links
International Paralympic Committee

References 

Nations at the 2000 Summer Paralympics
2000
Para